The Main road 445 is a short bypass direction Secondary class main road near Kecskemét, that connects the Main road 44 to the M5 motorway's Kecskemét északi elkerülő junction.

The road, as well as all other main roads in Hungary, is managed and maintained by Magyar Közút, state owned company.

See also

 Roads in Hungary

Sources

External links
 Hungarian Public Road Non-Profit Ltd. (Magyar Közút Nonprofit Zrt.)
 National Infrastructure Developer Ltd.

Main roads in Hungary
Bács-Kiskun County